Gordon Ray Windhorn (December 19, 1933 – May 21, 2022) was an American professional baseball player who appeared in 95 games played over parts of three seasons (and ) in Major League Baseball as an outfielder for the New York Yankees, Los Angeles Dodgers, Kansas City Athletics, and Los Angeles Angels. He also played six seasons in Japan for the Hankyu Braves from 1964–1969. He attended Arizona State University.

Windhorn's professional career extended from 1952 through 1963. He signed originally with the New York Giants, but made his MLB debut with the Yankees in September 1959 when he went hitless in 11 at bats. Traded to the Los Angeles Dodgers at the beginning of the  campaign, he played for their Triple-A affiliates the Montreal Royals (1960) and Omaha Dodgers (early 1961), before his recall to Los Angeles for his most successful MLB stint. Playing in 34 games for the 1961 Dodgers, he had eight hits in 33 at bats, and slugged his only two big-league home runs: they came in back-to-back games against the Philadelphia Phillies September 11-12.  He rounded out his MLB tenure in 1962 by getting into 54 games combined for the Athletics and Angels, then spent 1963 at Triple-A before decamping for Japan.

As a major leaguer, Windhorn collected 19 hits, 11 of them for extra bases; he batted .176 with eight runs batted in. In Nippon Professional Baseball, he got into 641 games, with 501 hits, including 86 homers, and posted a .255 batting mark.

References

External links

1933 births
2022 deaths
American expatriate baseball players in Japan
Baseball players from Illinois
California Angels scouts
Danville Leafs players
Denver Bears players
Hankyu Braves players
Hawaii Islanders players
Kansas City Athletics players
Los Angeles Angels players
Los Angeles Dodgers players
Major League Baseball outfielders
Montreal Royals players
New York Yankees players
Oklahoma City Indians players
Omaha Dodgers players
Oshkosh Giants players
People from Watseka, Illinois
Phoenix Senators players
Portland Beavers players
Richmond Virginians (minor league) players
San Francisco Seals (baseball) players
San Diego Padres (minor league) players
Sioux City Soos players
Sunbury Giants players
American expatriate baseball players in the Dominican Republic
American expatriate baseball players in Canada